Naram-Suen (Naram-Sin) may refer to any of four kings in the history of Mesopotamia:

 Naram-Sin of Akkad, an Akkadian king, the most famous of the four
 Naram-Sin of Assyria, an Assyrian king
 Naram-Sin of Uruk, a king of Uruk
 Naram-Suen of Eshnunna, a king of Eshnunna

See also 
 List of lists of ancient kings